Mikhail Sergeyevich Mikhaylov (born 11 November 1981) is a former Russian professional association football player.

Club career
He made his Russian Football National League debut for FC Dynamo Makhachkala on 28 March 2004 in a game against FC Lisma-Mordovia Saransk. Next season, he also played in the FNL for FC Avangard Kursk.

External links

1981 births
Living people
Russian footballers
Association football defenders
FC Dynamo Stavropol players
FC Olimpia Volgograd players
FC Lokomotiv Moscow players
FC Anzhi Makhachkala players
FC Avangard Kursk players
FC Mashuk-KMV Pyatigorsk players
FC Spartak-MZhK Ryazan players
FC Dynamo Makhachkala players